Separate lists have been created for each letter or new group of letters:
 List of films: S
 List of films: T
 List of films: U-V-W
 List of films: X-Y-Z

-